Uriah Louis "Ri" Jones (February 4, 1859 – November 29, 1936) was an American Major League Baseball player who played infielder from  to . He played for the Louisville Eclipse and Cincinnati Outlaw Reds.

External links

1859 births
1936 deaths
19th-century baseball players
Major League Baseball infielders
Louisville Eclipse players
Cincinnati Outlaw Reds players
Quincy Quincys players
Springfield (minor league baseball) players
Dayton (minor league baseball) players
Baseball players from Ohio